Amal Ramsis is an Egyptian filmmaker. She studied directing at the International Film and Television School in Madrid.

Filmography

She has also directed Silence and Plateau.

Prizes
Ramsis' Forbidden has been awarded the Audience Award for the Best Feature Documentary in Drac Magic (May 2011), the Best Film in the Arab Film Festival of Rotterdam (September 2011), the Best Film for Human Rights in the Festival Internacional de Cine Invisible de Bilbao (September 2011), the Best Film in the Festival of Political Cinema realized by Women of Madrid (December 2011) and the Best Documentary Film in the Festival Internacional de Cine Pobre (April 2012); it was also screened at the Millennium Film Festival and the Arab Film Festival Berlin. Her The Trace of the Butterfly, an entirely independent film with no external funding, has received the Audience Award in Dortmund | Cologne's International Women's Film Festival and screened at the Istanbul Film Festival, the CINEQUEST Film Festival at California, Her Africa Film Festival and the IAWRT African Film Festival.

Contributions to film festivals

Cairo International Women's Film Festival
In 2008, she founded Caravan of Arab and Latin American Women's Films or Entre Cineastas, which developed later into the Cairo International Women's Film Festival.
It is the first festival of its kind in the Arab World. Ramsis also heads the One-Minute Workshop program where she trains non-professional women in the basics of cinematography and short film directing.

Dortmund | Cologne International Women's Film Festival
Ramsis served on the Rwe Film Award selection jury in 2015.

References

External links
 Amal Ramsis on IMDb
 Amal Ramsis' Vimeo Channel

Year of birth missing (living people)
Living people
Egyptian film directors
Egyptian women film directors
Egyptian documentary filmmakers
Women documentary filmmakers